Ricky Martin is the fifth studio album and first English album by Puerto Rican singer Ricky Martin. It was released on May 11, 1999, by Columbia Records. Following the release of four Spanish-language albums, and the huge success of his fourth studio album, Vuelve (1998), Martin announced the recording of his first English language album. He worked with producers KC Porter, Robi Rosa, and Desmond Child to create the album. Musically, Ricky Martin consists of dance-pop tracks, power ballads, mid-tempo pop songs, and rock numbers. After the album's release, Martin embarked on the worldwide Livin' la Vida Loca Tour, which was the highest-grossing tour of 2000 by a Latin artist.

The album was supported by four singles. The lead single "Livin' la Vida Loca" topped the charts in more than 20 countries and is considered to be Martin's biggest hit and one of the best-selling singles of all time. It topped the Billboard Hot 100 chart for five consecutive weeks, becoming Martin's first number one single on the chart. Follow-up singles "She's All I Ever Had", "Shake Your Bon-Bon", and "Private Emotion" became number one and top 10 hits around the world. Ricky Martin received generally favorable reviews from music critics, who complimented its various genres and styles. Paste ranked the album as one of the "10 Best Solo Albums by Former Boy Band Members" in 2020. It was nominated for Best Pop Album at the 42nd Annual Grammy Awards.

The album was a commercial success. It debuted atop the US Billboard 200 with first-week sales of 661,000 copies, becoming the largest sales week by any album in 1999 and breaking the record as the largest first-week sales for any pop or Latin artist in history. Additionally, it made Martin the first male Latin act in history to debut at number one on Billboard 200. Ricky Martin also topped the charts in Australia, Canada, and Spain, among others. The album has received several certifications, including 7× platinum in the United States, and diamond in Canada. Only within three months, it became the best-selling album ever by a Latin artist. It is generally seen as the album that began the "Latin explosion" and paved the way for a large number of other Latin artists such as Jennifer Lopez, Shakira, Christina Aguilera, Marc Anthony, Santana, and Enrique Iglesias.

Background and recording

In 1998, Ricky Martin released his fourth studio album, Vuelve. The album experienced both critical and commercial success, spending 26 weeks atop the US Billboard Top Latin Albums chart. "La Copa de la Vida" was released as the second single from the album, and became the official song of the 1998 FIFA World Cup in France. It topped the charts in more than 30 countries, and Martin performed it at the 41st Annual Grammy Awards, which was greeted with a massive standing ovation and met with acclaim from music critics. On October 22, 1998, CNN confirmed that Martin had started working on his first English language album, following the huge success of Vuelve. On March 6, 1999, almost two weeks after his Grammy performance, it was announced that the album had been set for release in May. While the album was still untitled at the time, American musician Diane Warren revealed that she contributed two songs to the album, which was produced by KC Porter, Robi Rosa, and Desmond Child. During an interview with the Orlando Sentinel, Martin told the newspaper that this album has Asian influences:

On April 24, 1999, Billboard revealed the album's title as eponymous in an article, mentioning that it was initially set for retail on May 25, 1999. However, the huge interest in the disc encouraged Columbia Records to decide to rush the album to release two weeks ahead of schedule, on May 11. Tom Corson, the senior vice president of marketing at Columbia explained: "Quite simply, the market has demanded it. People have been wanting this record for a while, and it's now reached the point where we have to get it out there immediately." Tim Devin, the general manager of Tower Records in New York added about Martin: "He's always been one of our strongest Latin artists, but interest in him has picked up considerably since that performance." In an interview with MTV, Martin told the channel about the album's title: "I cannot wear a mask to go on stage. Those are my influences. This is Ricky Martin. That's why the album is called Ricky Martin. As simple is that. We want to keep it simple. Like Einstein said, 'Let's make it simple, but not simpler than what it is.' And this is me."

Music and lyrics

Ricky Martin is a primarily English language album composed of 14 songs, consisting dance-pop tracks, power ballads, mid-tempo pop songs, and "straight-ahead" rock numbers. Ed Morales from Democrat and Chronicle stated that the album "runs the gamut from ska and rock' n' roll to Latin pop". "Livin' la Vida Loca" is a rock-etched up-tempo pop song that features Latin percussion rhythms and horn riffs mixed with surf rock-inspired guitar riffs. It has salsa-rock fusion influences, and is about an irresistible, particularly sinister wild woman who lives on the edge, seducing others into her crazy world. The album also contains a Spanish-language version of "Livin' la Vida Loca", which was recorded under the same title.

In "Spanish Eyes", Martin refers to sultriness, tango, and dance over salsa descarga and up-tempo beats. The ballad "She's All I Ever Had" uses an Indian guitar and lyrically, is the tale of a man missing his woman, as he continues to live and breathe for her. It also has a Spanish version titled "Bella". Martin dedicated the track to his grandmother who died a year earlier. "Shake Your Bon-Bon" is a salsa party track and features a mix of pop, R&B, Middle Eastern riffs, and Latin horns, as well as a fusion of Latin percussion with retro organ. A Spanglish guitar-based down-tempo duet along with Madonna, "Be Careful (Cuidado con mi corazón)" mixes acoustic and electronic elements.

"I Am Made of You" is a "metal-type" ballad and uses electric guitar and drums that create a theme of "nostalgia and rock", while "Love You for a Day" is a "high-energy" Latin funk track featuring Latin elements, such as lengthy descargas, piano tumbaos, Latin percussion, and horns. The ballad "Private Emotion", which features a guest appearance by Swedish singer Meja is a cover version of a song under the same title by the Hooters for their fifth studio album Out of Body (1993). "You Stay With Me" is a slow ballad with "heart-wrenching" lyrics, and "I Count the Minutes" is a homage to the 1980s. Ricky Martin also features the Spanglish radio edit versions of "La Copa de la Vida" and "María", which were released as singles for Martin's previous albums. This version of "María" is remixed by Puerto Rican DJ Pablo Flores, who upped the tempo and the sex appeal of the song, turning the slow-burn flamenco laced track into an up-tempo samba tune in a house bassline. "La Copa de la Vida" is a samba-rooted Latin pop song, and features elements of batucada, salsa, dance, mambo, and Europop. Throughout the song, Martin carries a "soccer-heavy" message with fully positive lyrics.

Singles
Columbia Records released "Livin' la Vida Loca" to radio stations on March 23, 1999, as the lead single from the album. The song topped the charts in more than 20 countries and is considered to be Martin's biggest hit, and one of the best-selling singles of all time. In the United States, it topped the Billboard Hot 100 chart for five consecutive weeks, becoming Martin's first number one single on the chart. Additionally, it broke several records on Billboard charts. It also spent eight consecutive weeks atop the Canada Top Singles chart and topped the country's year-end chart. In the United Kingdom, it debuted at number one and stayed there for three weeks, making Martin the first Puerto Rican artist in history to hit number one. The track was ranked as the best '90s pop song by Elle, and was listed among the Best Latin Songs of All Time by Billboard. It was nominated for four categories at the 42nd Annual Grammy Awards, including Record of the Year and Song of the Year. Its Spanish version reached the summit of the Billboard Hot Latin Tracks chart in the United States, and was nominated for Record of the Year at the 2000 Latin Grammy Awards.

"She's All I Ever Had" was released as the second single from the album on June 15, 1999. It peaked at numbers two and three on the US Billboard Hot 100 and Canada Top Singles charts, respectively. The Spanish version, "Bella" topped the charts in Costa Rica, El Salvador, Guatemala, Mexico, and Panama, as well as Billboards Hot Latin Tracks chart. It also peaked at number two in Honduras, Nicaragua, and Puerto Rico. The third single from Ricky Martin, "Shake Your Bon-Bon" was released on October 12, 1999; it reached the top 10 in Canada, Finland, and New Zealand, as well as the top 15 in Spain, Scotland, and the United Kingdom. In the United States, it peaked at number 22 on the Hot 100. The album's final single, "Private Emotion", was launched on February 8, 2000. It reached number one in the Czech Republic, and was a top 10 hit in Finland, Norway, Scotland, Sweden, Switzerland, and the United Kingdom. Music videos were filmed for both English and Spanish versions of "Livin' la Vida Loca", "She's All I Ever Had", "Bella", "Shake Your Bon-Bon", and "Private Emotion".

Marketing

Release
Ricky Martin was released worldwide by Columbia Records on May 11, 1999. The European edition of Ricky Martin includes the Spanish version of "Spanish Eyes", titled "La Diosa Del Carnaval", as well as a new track "I'm On My Way", while the Spanglish radio edit versions of "La Copa de la Vida" and "María" are not featured. This track list has been also used for the African, Asian, and Latin American editions. The Chinese edition contains both "La Copa de la Vida" and "María" in addition to the standard Asian track list. The Spanish release uses the same track list as the European, but "Por Arriba, Por Abajo" from Martin's previous album, Vuelve, has been added as a hidden track as well. According to The Wall Street Journal, Martin succeeded Leonardo DiCaprio as "the reigning king of heartthrobs" to become the most popular male celebrity on the American shopping website eBay in 1999, following the album's release. Many Martin products and items were on sale at the time, such as his posters, autographs, Pepsi cans, wall clocks, plastic dolls, autographed Ricky Martin CDs, and "Livin' la Vida Loca" sheet musics.

Live performances

To further promote Ricky Martin, he embarked on the worldwide Livin' la Vida Loca Tour. The tour began on October 21, 1999, at the Miami Arena in Miami, Florida, and concluded on October 25, 2000, at the Colonial Stadium in Melbourne, with concerts throughout North America, Europe, Oceania, and Asia. In the United States, the Livin' la Vida Loca Tour was the highest-grossing tour of 2000 by a Latin artist, earning over $36.3 million with 44 dates and drawing 617,488 fans. According to Billboard Boxscore, the tour grossed $51.3 million in Canada, Mexico, and the United States, with 60 shows and drawing an audience of 875,151. International dates were not reported to Boxscore and would push the tour's grosses higher. In addition to his tour, Martin performed singles from Ricky Martin on many television programs and award shows. He performed "Livin' la Vida Loca" at the 1999 World Music Awards, the 1999 Blockbuster Entertainment Awards, Saturday Night Live, The Rosie O'Donnell Show, The Tonight Show with Jay Leno, and Bingolotto TV Show. At the 1999 MTV Video Music Awards, he performed "She's All I Ever Had" and "Livin' la Vida Loca", accompanied by a group of impressive women dressed in glitter. To promote the album's material in the United Kingdom, Martin delivered performances of "Livin' la Vida Loca" and "Shake Your Bon-Bon" on the BBC's Top of the Pops on August 6, 1999, and November 19, 1999, respectively.

Critical reception

Ricky Martin has been met with generally favorable reviews from music critics. In a retrospective review for AllMusic, senior editor Stephen Thomas Erlewine gave the album four out of five stars and said that despite moments of filler and outdated production, its songs are balanced well between various genres and styles on "a big, bold album with something to please everyone, from his longtime Latin fans to housewives with a weakness for dramatic ballads". He noted that all tracks have been constructed carefully on their own, and complimented Martin's "fine voice and undeniable charisma" that bring all tracks "alive", calling him "a true star". Rolling Stones James Hunter felt it lacks the excitement of Martin's 1998 album Vuelve because of its remixes and Warren-penned songs. However, he said that Martin's take on Latin pop is made interesting enough by highlights such as "Livin' la Vida Loca", "Shake Your Bon-Bon", and the "perfectly constructed ballad" sung with Madonna.

The News Journal critic Jena Montgomery complimented Ricky Martin for alternating between "infectious tunes" and "somber, seductive ballads", stating that his "upbeat pop tunes will undoubtedly catch your ear and stay in your head" and the ballads "are strikingly well-written and performed". She added that Martin "sings with such passion and tenderness" that "keeps you hanging on, begging for more". Steve Dollar from The Atlanta Journal-Constitution described the album as "shockingly irresistible", and Jim Farber from Daily News thought it is "certainly an improvement over Martin's four Spanish records". The Indianapolis Star reviewer Diana Penner gave it three out of four stars, describing Martin's pop tunes as "melodic and eminently listenable". She also highlighted "Livin' la Vida Loca", confessing that she does not know any "more happy-snappy catchy melody" than that. Another author of The Indianapolis Star praised Martin for mixing styles well from pop to funk, and noted the album tracks' Latin rhythms that make "Martin automatically separate himself from the rest of "popular male artists".

The Times staff assured Martin would be a "household name" before the end of the summer, and described the project as "cheesy, breezy, mass-appeal pop". The staff also called the duet with Madonna "superb" and celebrated Martin's "sincerely" singing with Meja. In a retrospective review for Billboard, Leila Cobo described Ricky Martin as "an album that went from percussion-filled dance tracks" to "smooth, unabashedly romantic ballads". She ranked "Livin' la Vida Loca" as the best track on the album and praised most of the other tracks of the record, naming "Private Emotion" the "under-appreciated jewel" of the album and calling it a "gorgeous ballad". She noted "immediately hummable melodies, traces of nostalgia and rock" in "I Am Made of You", labeling the track "a beauty". In another article, she described Ricky Martin as dazzling. Coinciding with the album's 20th anniversary, Celia San Miguel of Tidal Magazine gave it a positive review, highlighting "Livin' la Vida Loca" for its "clever fusion of ska, rock, mambo, swing and pop sounds", and "She's All I Ever Had" for Martin's "charismatic heartthrob and his passionate and emotive vocals". She stated that "in 1999, Martin's star power became undeniable". In 2020, Daniella Boik from Paste acknowledged the album as Martin's most influential album since starting his solo career.

Accolades
In 2019, Stacker ranked Ricky Martin as the 18th best album by an LGBTQ musician.  In 2020, Paste ranked it at number eight on the list of "Best Solo Albums by Former Boy Band Members". The album has received a number of awards and nominations. It was nominated for Best Pop Album at the 42nd Annual Grammy Awards, but lost to Brand New Day by Sting.

Commercial performance
Ricky Martin debuted atop the US Billboard 200 with first-week sales of 661,000 copies, according to data compiled by Nielsen SoundScan for the chart dated May 29, 1999. It became the largest sales week by any album in 1999, surpassing I Am... by Nas, which had sold 471,000 copies in its first week. It also broke the record as the largest first-week sales for any pop or Latin artist in history, as well as any Columbia Records artist during the SoundScan era. With this album, Martin became the first male Latin act in history to debut at number one on the US Billboard 200 chart. Additionally, he became the first artist to simultaneously top the Billboard 200, Hot Latin Tracks, Hot Dance Music/Club Play, Hot Dance Music/Maxi-Singles Sales, Top 40 Tracks, and the Billboard Hot 100. The following week, the album sold 471,000 copies, while Millennium by Backstreet Boys debuted at number one on Billboard 200 with first-week sales of 1.13 million copies, breaking Ricky Martins record as the largest sales week by an album in 1999.

Ricky Martin sold a total of six million copies in the United States in 1999 and was the third best-selling album of the year in the country, only behind Millennium, and ...Baby One More Time by Britney Spears. In January 2000, Ricky Martin was certified 7× platinum by the Recording Industry Association of America (RIAA), denoting shipments of over seven million copies in the US and breaking the record as the best-selling album by a Latin artist in the country. As of January 2011, the album has sold over 6,958,000 copies in the country, according to Nielsen SoundScan, with an additional 987,000 sold at BMG Music Clubs, making it Martin's best-selling album in the US. Nielsen SoundScan does not count copies sold through clubs like the BMG Music Service, which were significantly popular in the 1990s.

The album debuted at number one in Australia, on the chart issue dated May 23, 1999. It was later certified triple platinum by the Australian Recording Industry Association (ARIA), denoting shipments of over 210,000 copies in the country. In Canada, it peaked at number one on both the RPMs Top 100 CDs chart and the Billboards Canadian Albums Chart, and was certified diamond by the Canadian Recording Industry Association (CRIA), denoting shipments of over one million units in the region. The album also reached number one in Spain, where it was certified triple platinum by the Productores de Música de España (Promusicae), denoting shipments of over 300,000 copies. Additionally, Ricky Martin peaked at number one in Europe, Finland, New Zealand, and Norway, as well as the top five in many countries, such as Germany, Japan, and the United Kingdom. In Japan, it was certified million by the Recording Industry Association of Japan (RIAJ), denoting shipments of over one million units. Only within three months, Ricky Martin became the best-selling album ever by a Latin artist. According to different sources, the album has sold over 15 million copies or even 17 million copies worldwide.

Legacy and influence

Martin is regarded by the media as the "Original Latin Crossover King". Angie Romero from Billboard wrote: "If you look up 'crossover' in the dictionary, there should be a photo of Ricky shaking his bon bon and/or 'Livin' la Vida Loca'." Following his performance of "The Cup of Life" at the Grammys, and the success of "Livin' la Vida Loca" and Ricky Martin (1999), he opened the gates for many Latin artists such as Jennifer Lopez, Shakira, Christina Aguilera, Marc Anthony, Santana, and Enrique Iglesias who released their crossover albums and followed him onto the top of the charts. Jim Farber from Daily News noted that Ricky Martin "provides a textbook example of how to mix Latin beats with pop tunes and rock intonations". Lucas Villa from Spin wrote about Martin's global success in 1999: "When the world went loca for Ricky, he led the way for other Latin music superstars like Spain's Enrique Iglesias, Colombia's Shakira and Nuyoricans like Jennifer Lopez and Marc Anthony to make their marks beyond the Spanish-speaking crowds." St. Louis Post-Dispatch critic Kevin C. Johnson described Martin as Latin music's "pretty-faced poster boy" who is "taking the music to places Jon Secada, Selena and Santana never could". He also mentioned that even "Gloria Estefan at her peak, failed to muster up the kind of hype and hoopla surrounding Martin".

Celia San Miguel of Tidal Magazine stated that Martin "highlighted the public's thirst for a different kind of pop" in 1999, noting the album's "fusion-heavy" and "hip-shaking rhythms associated with Latin music". She mentioned that the album "spawned 1999's Latin music boom", emphasizing the fact that Martin created the "spark" of the "Latin Pop Explosion", which was followed by 1999 albums, On the 6 by Lopez, Enrique by Iglesias, and Anthony's eponymous album. She continued crediting "Martin and the paths he created" responsible for the Latin music and Spanish and Spanglish lyrics being "a commonplace phenomenon on English-language radio" in 2019. In her review for Grammy.com, Ana Monroy Yglesias said Martin led a "major music moment in 1999" with Ricky Martin, and along with him, "the first major boom of Spanish-language artists", such as Shakira and Lopez, came into the "U.S. pop landscape". Geoff Mayfield from Billboard stated: "Martin's triumph isn't just a big win for Latin music or the Sony camp but a big day for the entire music industry."

According to Pitchfork, the music industry took in revenues of $23.7 billion in 1999, making it the peak year of the business in history. It was also a significant growth in compare with 1998. The website highlighted ...Baby One More Time, Ricky Martin, and Millennium as examples of "blockbuster albums" which produced the result. Also, Rolling Stones Rob Sheffield described 1999 as "the year music exploded", mentioning Spears, Aguilera, Martin, NSYNC, and the Backstreet Boys as "a new breed of stars" who got born. Additionally, Jason Lipshutz from Billboard labeled 1999 "[the] Best Musical Year of the '90s".

Track listing

Personnel 

Credits for Ricky Martin adapted from AllMusic and the album liner notes.

Recording and mixing locations 

 The Gentlemen's Club, Miami Beach, Florida
 Sound Chamber, Modesto, California
 Crescent Moon Studios, Coral Terrace, Florida
 Guerilla Beach Studios, Toledo, Ohio
 Enterprise Studios, Burbank, California
 Right Track Recording, Manhattan
 Ocean Way Recording, Los Angeles
 Clinton Recording Studio, New York City
 Wallyworld, Pittsburgh
 The Hit Factory, New York City
 Barking Doctor Recording, Mount Kisco, New York
 Heaven Studios, Miami
 Tone King Studios, Cardinal, Ontario

Musicians and technical 

 Ricky Martin performer, primary artist, vocals, background vocals
 KC Porter composer, producer
 Robi Rosa composer, guest artist, acoustic guitar, producer, background vocals
 Desmond Child composer, producer
 Ethel Abelson violin
 Murray Adler violin
 Walter Afanasieff drum programming, producer
 Martin Agee violin
 Donna Allen background vocals
 Lamar Alsop violin
 Richard Altenbach violin
 Rusty Anderson guitar
 Tommy Anthony acoustic guitar, electric guitar 
 Jonathan Antin hair stylist
 Iris Aponte production coordination
 Chris Apostle project coordinator
 Kenny Aronoff drums, guest artist
 Vaje Ayrikian cello
 Julien Barber viola
 Randall Barlow composer, engineer, guitar, programming, string arrangements, trumpet
 Eric Bazilian composer, 12 string acoustic guitar, electric guitar 
 Jennifer Bellusci performer
 Brian Benning violin
 Robert Berg viola
 Ian Blake composer, producer
 Gustavo Bonnet assistant engineer
 Alfred Brown viola
 Ruth Bruegger violin
 Denyse Buffum viola
 Olbin Burgos percussion, shaker
 Kenneth Burward-Hoy viola
 Eve Butler violin
 Jorge Calandrelli conductor, string arrangements
 David Campbell conductor, orchestra contractor
 Darius Campo violin
 Scott Canto engineer
 Randy Cantor arranger, keyboards, programming
 Sue Ann Carwell background vocals
 Jorge Casas performer
 Susan Chatman violin
 Robert Chausow violin
 Rob Chiarelli engineer
 Joe Chiccarelli engineer
 Brian Coleman production coordination
 Tony Concepcion flugelhorn, trumpet
 Roberta Cooper cello
 Larry Corbett cello
 Paulinho Da Costa percussion
 Brian Dembow viola
 Joel Derouin violin
 John Dexter viola
 Thomas Diener viola
 Assa Drori violin
 Bruce Dukov concert master, violin
 Charles Dye engineer, mixing
 Max Ellen violin
 Mark Endert engineer
 Luis Enrique guest artist, percussion
 Jerry Epstein viola
 Stephen Erdody cello
 Luis Gómez Escolar composer
 Emilio Estefan, Jr. executive producer
 David Ewart violin
 Mary Helen Ewing viola
 Benny Faccone engineer
 Henry Ferber violin
 Michael Ferril violin
 Stefanie Fife cello
 Alfred Figueroa assistant engineer
 Pablo Flores producer
 Dave Frazier engineer
 Virginia Frazier violin
 Tod French cello
 Erik Friedlander cello
 Matthew Funes viola
 Armen Garabedian violin
 Berj Garabedian violin
 Hector Garrido conductor, horn arrangements, string arrangements
 Javier Garza engineer
 David Gleeson engineer
 Harris Goldman violin
 Jules Gondar engineer
 Diva Goodfriend-Koven alto flute
 Erwin Gorostiza art direction, design
 Endre Granat violin
 Lynn Grants viola
 Maurice Grants cello
 Julie Green viloncello
 Jeff Gregory assistant engineer
 Henry Gronnier violin
 Alan Grunfeld violin
 Mick Guzauski mixing
 Gyan guest artist
 Juliet Haffner viola
 Don Hahn engineer
 Clayton Haslop violin
 John Hayhurst viola
 Paquito Hechavarria piano
 David Heiss viloncello
 Leo Herrera assistant engineer
 Al Hershberger violin
 Gerry Hilera violin
 Tiffany Yi Hu violin
 Rob Hyman composer, organ
 Joanna Ifrah A&R
 Ted Jensen mastering
 Skyler Jett performer, background vocals
 Lisa Johnson violin
 Pat Johnson violin
 Pat Johnson violin
 Karen Karlsrud violin
 Dennis Karmazyn cello
 Suzie Katayama cello
 Khris Kellow programming
 Aimee Kreston violin
 John Kricker trombone
 Sebastián Krys engineer
 Janet Lakatos viola
 Michael Landau electric guitar 
 Regis Landiorio violin
 Ann Leathers violin
 Damian leGassick keyboards, programming
 Brian Leonard violin
 Lee Levin drums
 Elizabeth Lim violin
 Richard Locker cello
 Daniel Lopez percussion
 Manny López guitar
 Craig Lozowick assistant engineer, engineer
 Madonna composer, guest artist, performer, primary artist, producer
 Nathan Malki assistant engineer, engineer
 Tony Mardini assistant engineer
 Mark Markman violin
 Peter McCabe engineer
 Patrick McCarthy engineer, mixing
 Hugh McDonald bass
 Ángelo Medina executive producer
 Meja duet, guest artist, primary artist
 Lester Mendez programming
 Steve Menezes assistant engineer
 Vicky Miscolczy viola
 Dennis Molchan violin
 Conesha Monet background vocals
 Jorge Moraga viola
 Horia Moroaica violin
 Herman "Teddy" Mulet horn
 Jennifer Munday violin
 Dan Neufeld viola
 George Noriega bass, bazouki, composer, nylon string guitar, organ, producer, sitar
 Laura Oatts violin
 William Orbit composer, Guest Artist, guitar, keyboards, producer
 Germán Ortiz assistant engineer
 Rik Pekkonen engineer
 Archie Pena percussion
 Bob Peterson violin
 Freddy Piñero, Jr. engineer
 Barbara Porter violin
 Jim Porto assistant engineer
 Anthony Posk violin
 Sue Pray viola
 Rachel Purkin violin
 Rita Quintero background vocals
 Matthew Raimondi violin
 Dave Reitzas engineer
 Steve Richards cello
 Claytoven Richardson background vocals
 Karen Ritscher viola
 Gil Romero violin
 Anatoly Rosinsky violin
 Elliot Rosoff violin
 Danita Ruiz project coordinator
 Eddie Salkin alto flute
 Bob Sanov violin
 Sheldon Sanov violin
 Elliot Scheiner engineer
 Laura Seaton violin
 Jon Secada composer, guest artist, background vocals
 Dan Shea keyboards, programming
 Mark Orrin Shuman cello
 David Siegel clarinet
 Daniel Smith cello
 Rafael Solano percussion
 Eve Sprecher violin
 Rudy Stein cello
 David Stenske viola
 Dale Stuckenbruck violin
 Ricardo Suarez bass
 Marti Sweet violin
 Gerald Tarack violin
 Dana Teboe trombone
 Richard Treat cello
 Mari Tsumura violin
 Diego Uchitel photography
 Robert Valdez engineer
 Jose Luis Vega image construction
 John Walz cello
 Dan Warner acoustic guitar
 Diane Warren composer
 Miwako Watanabe violin
 Belinda Whitney-Barratt violin
 Chris Wiggins assistant engineer
 Ed Williams assistant engineer
 Elizabeth Wilson violin
 John Wittenberg violin
 Ming Yeh violin
 Ken Yerke violin
 Juan Vincente Zambrano arranger, keyboards
 Mihail Zinovyev viola
 Shari Zippert violin
 Wassim Zreik assistant engineer

Charts

Weekly charts

Year-end charts

Decade-end charts

Certifications and sales

Release history

See also

 1990s in music
 1999 in British music charts
 1999 in music
 Latin music in Canada
 List of best-selling albums in Japan
 List of Billboard 200 number-one albums of 1999
 List of certified albums in Canada
 List of diamond-certified albums in Canada
 List of European number-one hits of 1999
 List of number-one albums from the 1990s (New Zealand)
 List of number-one albums in Australia during the 1990s
 List of number-one albums of 1999 (Canada)
 List of number-one albums of 1999 (Spain)
 List of top 25 albums for 1999 in Australia
 List of top 25 albums for 2000 in Australia

Notes

References

1999 albums
Ricky Martin albums
Albums produced by Desmond Child
Albums produced by Emilio Estefan
Albums produced by Madonna
Albums produced by William Orbit
Columbia Records albums
Albums produced by Draco Rosa
Crossover (music)